Christopher Blanchett (born 1982) is an English broadcast journalist. He works for the BBC, presenting the weather forecast for Reporting Scotland. He has also worked as an assistant producer for the national BBC News Channel.

Education
Blanchett attended the Nottingham Trent University, graduating with a BA honours degree in human geography in 2004 and a master's degree in television journalism in 2005. He was tutored by Barnie Choudhury.

Broadcasting career
Blanchett started working for BBC South Today in Southampton as a broadcast journalist before moving to the national BBC News Channel in London to work as a producer for the BBC Weather Centre. He then moved to Glasgow to present the BBC's Reporting Scotland weather forecasts alongside Judith Ralston, Stav Danaos and Cat Cubie.

In 2012, he met and presented alongside Prince Charles, while the prince was on a visit to BBC Pacific Quay. With assistance from Blanchett, the prince presented the weather segment. Charles also comically stated during his forecast, "Who the hell wrote this script?" as references were made to royal residences.

References

External links
 ChristopherBlanchett (@BlanchettTweets) Twitter

1982 births
English television presenters
Living people
BBC newsreaders and journalists
Alumni of Nottingham Trent University